The Letrouitiaceae are a family of lichen-forming fungi belonging to the order Teloschistales. The family, which has a tropical and subtropical distribution, contains the single genus Letrouitia, which contains about 15 species.
 The family and the genus, both circumscribed in 1982 by André Bellemère and Josef Hafellner, are named in honour of Marie-Agnès Letrouit-Galinou.

Species
Letrouitia assamana 
Letrouitia aureola 
Letrouitia bifera  
Letrouitia corallina  
Letrouitia coralloidea  
Letrouitia domingensis  
Letrouitia flavidula  
Letrouitia flavocrocea  
Letrouitia hafellneri  
Letrouitia leprolyta  
Letrouitia leprolytoides  
Letrouitia magenta  
Letrouitia muralis  
Letrouitia parabola  
Letrouitia pseudomuralis  
Letrouitia spiralis  
Letrouitia subvulpina  
Letrouitia transgressa  
Letrouitia vulpina

References

Teloschistales
Lichen families
Lecanoromycetes families
Taxa named by Josef Hafellner
Taxa described in 1982